Jazz by Gee is the debut album by American jazz trombonist Matthew Gee featuring tracks recorded in 1956 for the Riverside label.

Reception

Allmusic awarded the album 2 stars with Scott Yanow stating "The music is quite bop-oriented and mixes together standards with three swinging Gee originals. An underrated and generally overlooked gem by a forgotten trombonist".

Track listing
All compositions by Matthew Gee except as indicated
 "Out of Nowhere" (Johnny Green, Edward Heyman) - 3:24   
 "I'll Remember April" (Gene de Paul, Patricia Johnston, Don Raye) - 4:16   
 "Joram" (Bill Massey) - 3:04   
 "Sweet Georgia Brown" (Ben Bernie, Kenneth Casey, Maceo Pinkard) - 2:58 
 "Lover Man" (Jimmy Davis, Ram Ramirez, Jimmy Sherman) - 6:11   
 "Gee!" - 5:00    
 "Kingston Lounge" - 8:45   
 "The Boys from Brooklyn" - 7:54
Recorded at Reeves Sound Studios in New York City on July 19 (tracks 6-8) and August 22 (tracks 1-5), 1956

Personnel 
Matthew Gee - trombone
Kenny Dorham - trumpet (tracks 6-8)
Ernie Henry - alto saxophone (tracks 1-5)
Frank Foster - tenor saxophone (tracks 6-8)
Cecil Payne - baritone saxophone (tracks 6-8)
Joe Knight - piano
John Simmons (tracks 6-8), Wilbur Ware (tracks 1-5) - bass
Art Taylor - drums

References 

1956 debut albums
Matthew Gee albums
Albums produced by Orrin Keepnews
Riverside Records albums